Liu Yichao (born 17 August 1995, in Shanghai) is a Chinese footballer who currently plays for Shanghai Shenxin in the China League One.

Club career
In July 2015, Liu Yichao started his professional footballer career with Shanghai Shenxin in the Chinese Super League. On 18 October 2015, Liu made his debut for Shanghai Shenxin in the 2015 Chinese Super League against Chongqing Lifan, coming on as a substitute for Zhang Wentao in the 71st minute.

Career statistics 
Statistics accurate as of match played 3 November 2018.

References

External links
 

1995 births
Living people
Chinese footballers
Footballers from Shanghai
Shanghai Shenxin F.C. players
Chinese Super League players
China League One players
Association football defenders 
Association football midfielders
21st-century Chinese people